The 2018–present Argentine monetary crisis is an ongoing severe devaluation of the Argentine peso, caused by high inflation and steep fall in the perceived value of the currency at the local level as it continually lost purchasing power, along with other domestic and international factors. As a result of it, the presidency of Mauricio Macri requested a loan from the International Monetary Fund.

Background
The presidency of Cristina Fernández de Kirchner ended in 2015, and the new president Mauricio Macri sought to change many of the abnormal aspects of the economy of Argentina left behind by Kirchner. The Central Bank of Argentina's reserves were depleted; the annual inflation was over 30 percent, and the country had the highest tax rates in history but the government budget balance had an eight-percent deficit, and the government faced international legal battles over its  sovereign default after the Kirchner administration refused to continue payments of the country's gigantic foreign debt. Tight currency controls had been in place since 2011 creating a parallel shadow market for foreign exchange currency and a global drop in commodity prices sharply reduced expected trade revenue furthering straining the country's already weak economy.
 
One of Macri's first economic policies was the removal of currency controls, allowing Argentinians to freely buy and sell foreign currencies on the market. Another early policy was the removal of export quotas and tariffs on corn and wheat. Tariffs on soybeans, Argentina's most lucrative export, were reduced from 35 to 30 percent. And he also ended the national default. Though these measures where applauded by the experts and foreign trade organisations, it failed to produce the economic boom that president Macri had promised during his campaign. Inflation remained high and the overall economic growth was weak. However, the modest economic recovery was enough to allow a victory at the 2017 midterm elections, surpassing Kirchner in the Buenos Aires province by a wide margin.

Ongoing crisis
Since the late 2010s, prolonged inflation remained a constant problem of economy of Argentina, with an annual rate of 25% in 2017, second only to Venezuela in South America and the highest in the G20. On December 28, the Central Bank of Argentina together with the Treasury announced a change of the inflation target.
The Central Bank attempted to reduce it to 15%, by adjusting its interest rates but these efforts only managed to stop further inflation rather than reduce it. An intense  drought, ranking among the world's worst natural disasters in 2018, reduced the production of soy and dried up tax revenue. 
Later that year the Federal Reserve of the United States increased interest rates from 0.25% to 1.75% and then 2%. This caused investors to return to the United States, leaving emerging markets. The effect, a rise in the price of the United States dollar, was modest in most countries, but it was felt particularly strongly in Argentina, Brazil and Turkey. 
Despite the high-interest rates and IMF support, investors feared that the country might fall into a sovereign default once again, especially if another administration were to be voted in during the next election cycle, and started pulling out investments.

All those factors led to a dramatic increase in the price of the US dollar in Argentina. The Central Bank increased the interest rate again, to 60%, but could not keep up.

Macri announced on May 8 that Argentina would seek a loan from the International Monetary Fund (IMF). The initial loan was $50 billion, and the country pledged to reduce inflation and public spending. Federico Sturzenegger, the president of the Central Bank of Argentina, resigned a week later, alongside much of its senior staff.

Macri replaced him with Luis Caputo, and merged the ministries of treasury and finances into a single ministry, led by Nicolás Dujovne. The Turkish currency and debt crisis caused yet another increase on the price of the dollar. The tariffs on soy exports were restored, as a result of the crisis.

Caputo resigned for personal reasons, and Guido Sandleris was appointed as president of the Central Bank.

The IMF expanded the loan with an extra 7 billion U.S. dollars, the largest loan in IMF history. In exchange, the Central Bank would operate on the price of the dollar only when it surpassed certain requirements. The national budget for 2019 reduced the deficit, which was 2.6 percent of GDP in 2018, to zero, and estimated that inflation would decrease from 44% to 23%. This budget was approved by the Congress, despite of demonstrations and Kirchnerist rejection.

In the 2019 presidential election, Cristina Kirchner's former chief of the cabinet Alberto Fernández was elected president. The new Kirchnerist administration immediately refused to take the remaining $11 billion of the loan, arguing that it was no longer obliged to adhere to the IMF conditions. The value of the peso continued to plummet as foreign investors pulled out and the COVID-19 pandemic hit the country in early 2020. Fernández soon brought back some of Cristina Kirchner's more criticized economic policies, often expanding on them. This included extremely tight control on all currency exchange operations, which involved setting a maximum exchange of $200 US dollars per month for all citizens, imposing a new 35% tax on all foreign currency exchange operations, and artificially freezing the official exchange rate. By September 2020 the government had severely restricted most exchange operations, especially for those citizens without stable incomes. These measures caused the underground foreign exchange market to come back to life, despite efforts made by the previous Macri's administration to stamp it out, further weakening Argentina's control over its economy.

See also 
 1998–2002 Argentine great depression
 Historical exchange rates of Argentine currency
 Latin American debt crisis
 2021–2023 inflation surge
 Economic impact of the COVID-19 pandemic
 2018–2023 Turkish currency and debt crisis

References

2018 in Argentina
2018 in economics
2019 in Argentina
2019 in economics
2020 in Argentina
2020 in economics
2021 in Argentina
2021 in economics
2022 in Argentina
2022 in economics
2023 in Argentina
2023 in economics
Currencies of Argentina
Economic crises
Economic history of Argentina
Financial crises
Inflation in Argentina
Presidency of Mauricio Macri
Presidency of Alberto Fernández